Donnchad Baccach Ó Maolconaire, Ollamh Síl Muireadaigh from 1385 to 1404.

Very little is known about Donnchad Baccach. The Annals of Connacht merely relate that he was Ollam of the Síol Muireadaigh in history. Given that all known past holders of the office had been drawn from the clan Ó Maolconaire, it is perhaps indicative of some unrest that the next Ollamh, at least as far as poetry, was from another family, the clan Ó Domhnalláin.

Sources

The Encyclopaedia of Ireland 2003; .
 Mac Dermot of Moylurg: The Story of a Connacht Family Dermot Mac Dermot, 1996.
A New History of Ireland VIII: A Chronology of Irish History to 1976 - A Companion to Irish History Part I edited by T.W. Moody, F.X. Martin and F.J. Byrne, 1982. 
The Celebrated Antiquary Nollaig O Muralie, Maynooth, 1996. 
Irish Leaders and Learning Through the Ages Fr. Paul Walsh, 2004. (ed. Nollaig O Muralie).

External links
List of Published Texts at CELT — University College Cork's Corpus of Electronic Texts

14th-century births
1404 deaths
15th-century Irish historians
14th-century Irish historians
15th-century Irish poets
People from County Roscommon
Irish male poets